Komnenović is a Serbo-croatian surname, derived from the name Komnen. It may refer to:

Komnenović brotherhood, in Banjani
Mitar Komnenović
Marko Komnenović
Mihailo Komnenović (fl. 1779)
Petar Komnenović, count
Mirko Komnenović (1870–1941), mayor of Herceg Novi
Jelica Komnenović (b. 1960) former Yugoslav basketball player
Dragan Komnenović, Serbian footballer
Pavle Komnenović, Serbian racer

See also
Komnenić, surname
Komnenos, Byzantine dynasty
Komlenović, surname
Komljenović, surname

Further reading

Serbian surnames